Electoral history of Walter Mondale, who served as the 42nd vice president of the United States (1977–1981); as a United States senator from Minnesota (1964–1976), and as the 23rd attorney general of Minnesota (1960–1964).

Attorney General of Minnesota

1962 
Minnesota Attorney General election, 1962:
 Walter Mondale * (DFL) – 730,783 (59.64%)
 Robert L. Kunzig (R) – 494,621 (40.36%)

United States Senate

1966 
Minnesota U.S. Senate election, 1966DFL primary:
 Walter Mondale * – 410,841 (90.97%)
 Ralph E. Franklin 40,785 (9.03%)

Minnesota U.S. Senate election, 1966:
 Walter Mondale * (DFL) – 685,840 (53.94%)
 Robert A. Forsythe (R) – 574,868 (45.21%)
 Joseph Johnson (SW) – 5,487 (0.43%)
 William Braatz (IG) – 5,231 (0.41%)

1972 
Minnesota U.S. Senate election, 1972DFL primary:
 Walter Mondale * – 230,679 (89.88%)
 Tom Griffin – 11,266 (4.39%)
 Richard Leaf – 7,750 (3.02%)
 Ralph E. Franklin – 6,946 (2.71%)

Minnesota U.S. Senate election, 1972:
 Walter Mondale * (DFL) – 981,320 (56.67%)
 Phil Hansen (R) – 742,121 (42.86%)
 Karl H. Heck (IG) – 8,192 (0.47%)

2002 
Minnesota U.S. Senate election, 2002:
 Norm Coleman (R) – 1,116,697 (49.53%)
 Walter Mondale (DFL) – 1,067,246 (47.34%)
 Jim Moore (IPM) – 45,139 (2.00%)
 Paul Wellstone *† (DFL) – 11,381 (0.51%)
 Ray Tricomo (G) – 10,119 (0.45%)
 Miro Drago Kovatchevich (C) – 2,254 (0.10%)
 Others – 1,796 (0.08%)

Presidential and vice presidential

1972 
Democratic Party presidential nomination, 1972:
 George McGovern – 1,729 (57.37%)
 Henry M. Jackson – 525 (17.42%)
 George Wallace – 382 (12.67%)
 Shirley Chisholm – 152 (5.04%)
 Terry Sanford – 78 (2.59%)
 Hubert Humphrey – 67 (2.22%)
 Wilbur Mills – 34 (1.13%)
 Edmund Muskie – 25 (0.83%)
 Ted Kennedy – 13 (0.43%)
 Wayne Hays – 5 (0.17%)
 Eugene McCarthy – 2 (0.07%)
 Ramsey Clark – 1 (0.03%)
 Walter Mondale – 1 (0.03%)

1976 
Democratic Party vice presidential nomination, 1976:
 Walter Mondale – 2,817 (94.28%)
 Carl Albert – 36 (1.21%)
 Barbara Jordan – 25 (0.84%)
 Ron Dellums – 20 (0.67%)
 Henry M. Jackson – 16 (0.54%)
 Gary Benoit – 12 (0.40%)
 Frank Church – 11 (0.37%)
 Fritz Efaw – 11 (0.37%)
 Peter Flaherty – 11 (0.37%)
 George Wallace – 6 (0.20%)
 Allard Lowenstein – 5 (0.17%)
 Edmund Muskie – 4 (0.13%)
 Philip Hart – 2 (0.07%)
 Thomas E. Morgan – 2 (0.07%)
 Mo Udall – 2 (0.07%)
 Wendell Anderson – 1 (0.03%)
 Al Castro – 1 (0.03%)
 Fred R. Harris – 1 (0.03%)
 Ernest Hollings – 1 (0.03%)
 Peter Rodino – 1 (0.03%)
 Daniel Schorr – 1 (0.03%)
 Josephnie Smith – 1 (0.03%)
 Hunter S. Thompson – 1 (0.03%)

1976 United States presidential election
 Jimmy Carter and Walter Mondale (D)Popular vote: 40,831,881 (50.08%) Electoral votes: 297 (55.2%)
 Gerald Ford * and Bob Dole (R)Popular vote: 39,148,634 (48.01%) Electoral votes: 240
 Roger MacBride and David Bergland (L)Popular vote:172,557 (0.21%) Electoral vote: 0
 Lester Maddox and William Dyke (AI)Popular vote: 170,373 (0.21%) Electoral vote: 0
 Thomas J. Anderson and Rufus Shackelford (A)Popular vote: 158,724 (0.19%) Electoral votes: 0
 OthersPopular vote: 313,848 (0.39%) Electoral votes: 0

Notes

1980 
Democratic Party presidential nomination, 1980:
 Jimmy Carter * – 2,123 (64.04%)
 Ted Kennedy – 1,151 (34.72%)
 William Proxmire – 10 (0.30%)
 Koryne Kaneski Horbal – 5 (0.15%)
 Scott M. Matheson – 5 (0.15%)
 Ron Dellums – 3 (0.09%)
 Robert Byrd – 2 (0.06%)
 John Culver – 2 (0.06%)
 Kent Hance – 2 (0.06%)
 Jennings Randolph – 2 (0.06%)
 Warren Spannaus – 2 (0.06%)
 Alice Tripp – 2 (0.06%)
 Jerry Brown – 1 (0.03%)
 Dale Bumpers – 1 (0.03%)
 Hugh L. Carey – 1 (0.03%)
 Walter Mondale – 1 (0.03%)
 Edmund Muskie – 1 (0.03%)
 Thomas J. Steed – 1 (0.03%)

Democratic Party vice presidential nomination, 1980:
 Walter Mondale * – 2,429 (72.99%)
 Abstentions – 724 (21.76%)
 Melvin Boozer – 49 (1.44%)
 Ed Rendell – 28 (0.84%)
 Roberto A. Mondragon – 19 (0.57%)
 Patricia Stone Simon – 11 (0.33%)
 Tom Daschle – 10 (0.30%)
 Ted Kulongoski – 8 (0.24%)
 Shirley Chisholm – 6 (0.18%)
 Terry Chisholm – 6 (0.18%)
 Barbara Jordan – 4 (0.12%)
 Richard M. Nolan – 4 (0.12%)
 Patrick Joseph Lucey – 3 (0.09%)
 Jerry Brown – 2 (0.06%)
 George McGovern – 2 (0.06%)
 Eric Tovar – 2 (0.06%)
 Mo Udall – 2 (0.06%)
 Les Aspin – 1 (0.03%)
 Mario Biaggi – 1 (0.03%)
 George S. Broody – 1 (0.03%)
 Michella Kathleen Gray – 1 (0.03%)
 Michael J. Carrington – 1 (0.03%)
 Frank Johnson – 1 (0.03%)
 Eunice Kennedy Shriver – 1 (0.03%)
 Dennis Krumm – 1 (0.03%)
 Mary Ann Kuharski – 1 (0.03%)
 Jim McDermott – 1 (0.03%)
 Barbara Mikulski – 1 (0.03%)
 Gaylord Nelson – 1 (0.03%)
 George Orwell – 1 (0.03%)
 Charles Prine – 1 (0.03%)
 William A. Redmond – 1 (0.03%)
 Jim Thomas – 1 (0.03%)
 Elly Uharis – 1 (0.03%)
 Jim Weaver – 1 (0.03%)
 William Winpisinger – 1 (0.03%)

1980 United States presidential election:
 Ronald Reagan and George H. W. Bush (R)Popular vote: 43,903,230 (50.75%) Electoral votes: 489 (90.9%)
 Jimmy Carter * and Walter Mondale * (D)Popular vote: 35,480,115 (41.01%) Electoral votes: 49 (9.1%)
 John B. Anderson and Patrick Joseph Lucey (I)Popular vote: 5,719,850 (6.61%) Electoral votes: 0
 Ed Clark and David H. Koch (L)Popular vote: 921,128 (1.06%) Electoral votes: 0
 Barry Commoner and LaDonna Harris (C)Popular vote: 233,052 (0.27%) Electoral votes: 0
 OthersPopular vote: 252,303 (0.29%) Electoral votes: 0

1984 
1984 Democratic Party presidential primaries:
 Walter Mondale – 6,952,912 (38.32%)
 Gary Hart – 6,504,842 (35.85%)
 Jesse Jackson – 3,282,431 (18.09%)
 John Glenn – 617,909 (3.41%)
 George McGovern – 334,801 (1.85%)
 Unpledged delegates – 146,212 (0.81%)
 Lyndon LaRouche – 123,649 (0.68%)
 Reubin Askew – 52,759 (0.29%)
 Alan Cranston – 51,437 (0.28%)
 Ernest Hollings – 33,684 (0.19%)

Democratic Party presidential nomination, 1984:
 Walter Mondale – 2,191 (56.41%)
 Gary Hart – 1,201 (30.92%)
 Jesse Jackson – 466 (12.00%)
 Thomas Eagleton – 18 (0.46%)
 George McGovern – 4 (0.10%)
 John Glenn – 2 (0.05%)
 Joe Biden – 1 (0.03%)
 Martha Kirkland – 1 (0.03%)

1984 United States presidential election:
 Ronald Reagan * and George H. W. Bush * (R)Popular vote: 54,455,472 (58.77%) Electoral votes: 525 (97.58%)
 Walter Mondale and Geraldine Ferraro (D)Popular vote: 37,577,352 (40.56%) Electoral votes: 13 (2.42%)
 David Bergland and James A. Lewis (L)Popular vote: 228,111 (0.25%) Electoral vote: 0
 OthersPopular vote:392,298 (0.42%) Electoral votes: 0

Trivia 

Having lost all States except Minnesota in the 1984 Presidential election, and having lost the 2002 Minnesota Senatorial election, Mondale is the only politician to date to have lost a statewide vote in all 50 States.

References

Mondale, Walter
Walter Mondale